Kurabalakota is a census town in Annamayya district of the Indian state of Andhra Pradesh. It is a mandal headquarters of Thamballapalle Constituency in Madanapalle Revenue division

Geography
It has an average elevation of 764 meters (2211 feet).
Latitude 	13.6522 	Longitude 	78.4817 	 
Lat (DMS) 	13° 39' 8N 	Long (DMS) 	78° 28' 54E

Transport 
It is near Madanapalle & Horsley Hills. The National Highway 340, which connects Hyderabad–Tokapalle road, bypasses the village.

Sri Santhana Venugopala Swamy Temple, Thettu is located within 7 km.

References 

Villages in Annamayya district
Mandal headquarters in Annamayya district